Kishori Lal Goswami (1865–1932) was an Indian writer and novelist. He was born in the year 1865 in a family of Vrindavan. His family was a follower of the Nimbarka Sampradaya. In 1898, Kishori Lal Goswami brought out the magazine 'Novyas' in which his novels were published. He was a member of Saraswati (magazine)'s Panchayati Editorial Board. In addition to about 65 novels, he wrote many poems and his own masterly writings on various subjects. Goswami, the author of the stories Indumati and Gulbahar, has the credit of being the first story writer in Hindi language.

In 1898, Kishorilal Goswami launched a monthly journal Upanya, in which as many as sixty-five novels of Goswami were published. Some of his notable works includes Razia Begum, Triveni, Pranayini Parinay, Lavanglata, Aadarsh Bala, Rang Mahal Mein Halahal, Malti Madhav, Madan Mohini and Gulbahar.

In 1900, a short story named Indumati by Kishorilal Goswami was published in the newly launched Hindi magazine Saraswati. Considering it to be original work, some scholars have described it as the first short story in Hindi.

Books 
 Triveni Va Saubhagya Shreni (1888)
 Pranayini-Parinay (1887)
 Hridayaharini Va Aadarsh Ramani (1890)
 Lavanglata Va Aadarsh Bala (1890)
 Sultana Razia Begum Va Rang Mahal Mein Halahal (1904)
 Tarabai
 Gulbahar
 Heerabai Va Behayai Ka Borka (1904)
 Lavanyamayi
 Sukh Sharvari
 Premamayi
 Indumati Va Vanvihangini
 Gulbahar Va Aadarsh Bhratusneh (1902)
 Tara Va Kshatra Kul Kamlini (1902)
 Tarun Tapaswini Va Kutir Vasini
 Chandravali Va Kulta Kutuhal
 Jinde Ki Laash
 Madhavi-Madhava Va Madan-Mohini (in two parts)
 Leelavati Va Aadarsh Sati
 Rajkumari
 Chapla Va Navya Samaj Chitra
 Kanak Kusum Va Masatani (1904)
 Mallika Devi Va Bang Sarojini (1905)
 Punarjanma Va Sautiya Daah
 Sona Aur Sugandh Va Pannabai (1909)
 Anguthi Ka Nageena
 Lucknow Ka Kabra Va Shahi Mahalsara (1906-16)
 Lal Kunwar Va Shahi Rangmahal (1909)
 Gupt Godna (1922-23)

References

External links 
 

1865 births
1932 deaths
Writers from Varanasi
Hindi-language poets
Indian magazine editors
Poets from Uttar Pradesh
19th-century Indian poets
19th-century Indian novelists
Indian male poets
19th-century Indian male writers
Indian short story writers
Indian male short story writers